Sanna Stén (born 20 May 1977 in Lohja) is a Finnish rower. She won a silver medal in the women's lightweight double sculls at the 2008 Summer Olympics.

References 
 Athlete bio at 2008 Olympics site
 

1977 births
Living people
Finnish female rowers
Olympic rowers of Finland
Rowers at the 2008 Summer Olympics
Olympic silver medalists for Finland
Olympic medalists in rowing
Medalists at the 2008 Summer Olympics
World Rowing Championships medalists for Finland
European Rowing Championships medalists
People from Lohja
Sportspeople from Uusimaa
21st-century Finnish women